Isaac Homer (born February 25, 2003), is an American soccer player who plays as a defender for Portland Timbers 2 via the Portland Timbers academy.

Club career
After playing with the Portland Timbers academy from 2016 Ikobaeared for Portland's USL Championship side Portland Timbers 2 on September 2, 2020, starting in a 2–1 loss to Sacramento Republic.

References

External links
 

2003 births
Living people
Association football defenders
American soccer players
Sportspeople from Portland, Oregon
Portland Timbers 2 players
Soccer players from Oregon
United States men's youth international soccer players
USL Championship players